Cymindis afgana is a species of ground beetle in the subfamily Harpalinae. It was described by Jedlicka in 1956.

References

afgana
Beetles described in 1956